Julie LaRoche (born 1957) is a Canadian marine biologist. She is a Tier 1 Canada Research Chair in Marine Microbial Genomics and Biogeochemistry at Dalhousie University.

Early life and education
LaRoche was born in Quebec, Canada, in 1957. She earned her Bachelor of Science from McGill University and her PhD in Biological Oceanography at Dalhousie University. While earning her PhD at Dalhouse, she met her future husband Douglas Wallace.

Career
After completing her postdoctoral studies at Dalhousie University, LaRoche conducted research at the Brookhaven National Laboratory (BNL). While there, LaRoche co-published “Flavodoxin expression as an indicator of iron limitation in marine diatoms" with Helen Murray-Tobin which earned them the Luigi Provasoli Award from the Phycological Society of America for the most outstanding research paper published in the Journal of Phycology. She also studied how stress affects phytoplankton.  In 1998, LaRoche accepted a position at the University of Kiel as a professor in their Institute of Oceanography.

LaRoche and her husband stayed in Germany until 2010 when they both accepted placements at their alma mater, Dalhousie. LaRoche was appointed a Tier 1 Canada Research Chair in Marine Microbial Genomics and Biogeochemistry, and her husband was appointed the University's Canada Excellence Research Chair. Upon her return, she developed a lab to research how global climate change is affecting marine microbes and biochemical processes. She specifically studied how phytoplankton and marine bacteria are affected by increases in temperature and decreases in pH. In 2016, she received $149,900 in funding for her plankton research project, which allowed her to purchase a holographic microscope for a commercial ship she uses to study the Deep Panuke drilling station. Previously, her team had only been able to analyze sample of water twice a year until The Atlantic Canadian company voluntarily provided the lab with free access on the Atlantic Condor. The next year, she partnered with Canada C3, a 150-day expedition along the Atlantic, Arctic and Pacific coasts, to collect and share data.

In 2019, LaRoche was renewed as a Canada Research Chair.

References

External links 
 
 CRC profile

Living people
1957 births
Canada Research Chairs
Academics in Quebec
McGill University alumni
Dalhousie University alumni
Academic staff of the Dalhousie University
Canadian women academics
Canadian marine biologists
20th-century Canadian biologists
20th-century Canadian women scientists
21st-century Canadian biologists
21st-century Canadian women scientists
Women marine biologists